Jaylen Barron (born August 31, 1997) is an American actress, known for her roles as Dominique Winslow in the Showtime series Shameless and Zoe Phillips in the Netflix drama series Free Rein. In 2021, she began starring in the Starz series Blindspotting.

Early life
Barron was born on August 31, 1997, in Reno, Nevada. Barron and her family then relocated to Los Angeles, where she began acting. Barron's mother is of Mexican heritage, while her father is African American.

Career
Barron made her television debut in 2012, appearing in Bones and Shake It Up. She then went on to have recurring roles in See Dad Run, Good Luck Charlie and Shameless. When asked about her time on Shameless, she commented: "It was one of the best experiences. The people were amazing and talented. I learned so much and I carry the fast-paced style of acting throughout my career." In 2017, Barron was cast in the role of Zoe Phillips in the Netflix original drama series Free Rein. She has starred in all three seasons of the series, as well as appearing in two feature-length Free Rein films. In January 2021, Barron appeared in an episode of the Fox series 9-1-1. Later in 2021, she starred in the Starz series Blindspotting, a television adaptation of the 2018 film of the same name.

Filmography

References

External links 
 

1997 births
21st-century American actresses
Actresses from Reno, Nevada
African-American actresses
American actresses of Mexican descent
American television actresses
American voice actresses
Hispanic and Latino American actresses
Living people
21st-century African-American women
21st-century African-American people